Arthur Thompson or Art Thompson may refer to:

 Arthur Thompson (gangster) (1931–1993), Scottish gangster
 Arthur E. Thompson (1891–1969), North Dakota politician 
 Arthur Lisle Thompson (1884–1949), Liberal party member of the Canadian House of Commons
 Arthur Thompson (jockey) (1916–1988), Irish jockey
 Arthur R. Thompson (born 1938), CEO of the John Birch Society
 Arthur Thompson (English footballer) (1922–1996), English former footballer
 Arthur Thompson (Australian footballer) (1871–1955), Australian rules footballer
 Arthur Thompson (cricketer) (1914–1987), English cricketer
 Arthur Thompson (singer) (1942–2004), Metropolitan Opera singer
 Arthur Thompson (wrestler) (1911–1978), British Olympic wrestler
 Art Thompson (baseball), American baseball player; see 1884 Washington Nationals (UA) season

See also
 Arthur Thomson (disambiguation)
 Arthur Tomson (1859–1905), English painter